Paul Calvin Carpenter (August 12, 1894, at Granville, Ohio – March 14, 1968, at Newark, Ohio) was a minor league baseball player. He played for the Pittsburgh Pirates in 1916 and was the designated replacement for Jigger Statz, playing for the Los Angeles Angels in the Pacific Coast League, in the 1940 season. He was the uncle of Woody English, who also played professional baseball.

References

External links 

Pittsburgh Pirates players
Major League Baseball pitchers
People from Granville, Ohio
1894 births
1968 deaths
Toledo Iron Men players
Dallas Marines players